Sylvelin Vatle (born 4 September 1957 in Osterøy) is a Norwegian novelist and children's writer. She made her literary début in 1991 with the novel Alle kjenner vel presten?, for which she was awarded the Tarjei Vesaas' debutantpris. Among her children's books are Topphemmelig dagbok for Lars from 1988, and Tim Brentloffs eventyr from 2003.

References

1957 births
20th-century Norwegian novelists
21st-century Norwegian novelists
Norwegian children's writers
Living people
Norwegian women novelists
Norwegian women children's writers
21st-century Norwegian women writers
20th-century Norwegian women writers
People from Osterøy